The Sunshine Heights Football Club is an Australian rules football club which compete in the WRFL since 1988. They are based in the Melbourne suburb of Sunshine West.

History 
In 1971, the club first fielded a senior team in the Western Suburbs FL. In 1979, they defeated Werribee Centrals for the premiership of the Western Suburbs FL.

The club transferred to the Footscray District FL in 1988. It won the A2 premiership defeating East Brunswick in its first year.

Guernsey

Premierships 
 Div 1 = 1979 (WSFL)
 Div 2 = 2008
 Div 3 = 1988, 1998

VFL/AFL players 
 James Gowans – St Kilda
 Chris Burton – Western Bulldogs
  Shane Madigan  -  Fitzroy Football club

Bibliography 
 History of the WRFL/FDFL by Kevin Hillier – 
 History of football in Melbourne's north west by John Stoward –

References

External links 
 Official website

Australian rules football clubs in Melbourne
Australian rules football clubs established in 1971
1971 establishments in Australia
Western Region Football League clubs
Sport in the City of Brimbank
Sunshine, Victoria